Alopecosa is a spider genus in the family Lycosidae (wolf spiders), with about 160 species. They have a largely Eurasian distribution, although some species are found in North Africa and North America.

Life cycle
Most species grow up to 2 cm. Alopecosa females make a burrow in which they deposit their egg sac. The female then stays in the burrow guarding the sac until the eggs hatch.

Taxonomy

The species in this genus have been traditionally grouped into sibling species complexes (groups) based on morphological characters, but, as morphology-based taxonomy can be unreliable, alternative methods have also been employed to identify species correctly. For example, differences in observed courtship and copulation behaviour have proved to be a useful tool for species identification and delimitation, particularly in cryptic species. Molecular techniques have also been applied to reconstruct phylogenetic relationships between some species.

Species
, the World Spider Catalog accepted the following species:

Alopecosa accentuata (Latreille, 1817) – Europe
Alopecosa aculeata (Clerck, 1757) – North America, Europe, Turkey, Caucasus, Russia (Europe to Far East), Iran, Central Asia, China, Japan
Alopecosa akkolka Marusik, 1995 – Kazakhstan, China
Alopecosa albofasciata (Brullé, 1832) – Mediterranean to Central Asia
Alopecosa albonotata (Schmidt, 1895) – Russia (Middle Siberia)
Alopecosa albostriata (Grube, 1861) – Russia (West to East Siberia, Far East)
Alopecosa albovittata (Schmidt, 1895) – Russia (Middle Siberia)
Alopecosa alpicola (Simon, 1876) – Spain, France, Italy, Russia (Europe), China, Caucasus?, Kazakhstan?
Alopecosa andesiana (Berland, 1913) – Ecuador
Alopecosa artenarensis Wunderlich, 1992 – Canary Is.
Alopecosa atis Caporiacco, 1949 – Libya
Alopecosa auripilosa (Schenkel, 1953) – Russia (Far East), China, Korea
Alopecosa aurita Chen, Song & Kim, 2001 – China
Alopecosa ayubaevorum Fomichev & Logunov, 2015 – Russia (Altai)
Alopecosa azsheganovae Esyunin, 1996 – Russia (Europe to South Siberia)
Alopecosa balinensis (Giltay, 1935) – Indonesia (Bali)
Alopecosa beckeri (Thorell, 1875) – Ukraine
Alopecosa camerunensis Roewer, 1960 – Cameroon
Alopecosa canaricola Schmidt, 1982 – Canary Is.
Alopecosa cedroensis Wunderlich, 1992 – Canary Is.
Alopecosa chagyabensis Hu & Li, 1987 – China
Alopecosa cinnameopilosa (Schenkel, 1963) – Kazakhstan, Russia (Central Asia to Far East), China, Korea, Japan
Alopecosa cronebergi (Thorell, 1875) – Slovakia, Ukraine, Russia (Europe), Caucasus, Kazakhstan
Alopecosa cuneata (Clerck, 1757) – Europe, Turkey, Caucasus, Russia (Europe to Far East), Kazakhstan, China
Alopecosa cursor (Hahn, 1831) – Europe, Turkey, Caucasus, Russia (Europe to South Siberia), Iran, Central Asia, China
Alopecosa cursorioides Charitonov, 1969 – Uzbekistan, Turkmenistan
Alopecosa curtohirta Tang, Urita & Song, 1993 – China
Alopecosa deserta Ponomarev, 2007 – Kazakhstan
Alopecosa disca Tang, Yin & Yang, 1997 – China
Alopecosa dryada Cordes, 1996 – Greece
Alopecosa edax (Thorell, 1875) – Poland, China
Alopecosa ermolaevi Savelyeva, 1972 – Kazakhstan
Alopecosa etrusca Lugetti & Tongiorgi, 1969 – Italy, North Macedonia, Turkey
Alopecosa exasperans (O. Pickard-Cambridge, 1877) – Canada, Greenland
Alopecosa fabrilis (Clerck, 1757) (type species) – Europe, Turkey, Russia (Europe to Far East), Central Asia, China
Alopecosa farinosa (Herman, 1879) – Europe, Turkey, Caucasus, Russia (Europe to Far East), Kazakhstan, Iran?
Alopecosa fedotovi (Charitonov, 1946) – Central Asia
Alopecosa fuerteventurensis Wunderlich, 1992 – Canary Is.
Alopecosa fulvastra Caporiacco, 1955 – Venezuela
Alopecosa gachangensis Seo, 2017 – Korea
Alopecosa garamantica (Caporiacco, 1936) – Libya
Alopecosa gomerae (Strand, 1911) – Canary Is.
Alopecosa gracilis (Bösenberg, 1895) – Canary Is.
Alopecosa grancanariensis Wunderlich, 1992 – Canary Is.
Alopecosa hamata (Schenkel, 1963) – China
Alopecosa hermiguensis Wunderlich, 1992 – Canary Is.
Alopecosa himalayaensis Hu, 2001 – China
Alopecosa hingganica Tang, Urita & Song, 1993 – Mongolia, China
Alopecosa hirta (Kulczyński, 1908) – Russia (north-eastern Siberia)
Alopecosa hirtipes (Kulczyński, 1907) – Canada, USA (Alaska), Russia (Europe to Far East)
Alopecosa hoevelsi Schmidt & Barensteiner, 2000 – China
Alopecosa hokkaidensis Tanaka, 1985 – Russia (Far East), China, Japan
Alopecosa huabanna Chen, Song & Gao, 2000 – China
Alopecosa hui Chen, Song & Kim, 2001 – China
Alopecosa inderensis Ponomarev, 2007 – Russia (Europe), Kazakhstan
Alopecosa inimica (O. Pickard-Cambridge, 1885) – Tajikistan
Alopecosa inquilina (Clerck, 1757) – Europe, Russia (Europe to Far East), Kazakhstan
Alopecosa irinae Lobanova, 1978 – Russia (South Siberia)
Alopecosa kalahariana Roewer, 1960 – Botswana
Alopecosa kalavrita Buchar, 2001 – Greece
Alopecosa kaplanovi Oliger, 1983 – Russia (Far East)
Alopecosa kasakhstanica Savelyeva, 1972 – Russia (West to South Siberia, Central Asia), Kazakhstan
Alopecosa kochi (Keyserling, 1877) – North America
Alopecosa koponeni Blagoev & Dondale, 2014 – Canada
Alopecosa kovblyuki Nadolny & Ponomarev, 2012 – Ukraine, Russia (Europe, West Siberia), Kazakhstan
Alopecosa kratochvili (Schenkel, 1963) – China
Alopecosa krynickii (Thorell, 1875) – Ukraine (Crimea)
Alopecosa kulczynski Sternbergs, 1979 – Russia (Middle Siberia to Far East)
Alopecosa kulczynskii (Bösenberg, 1895) – Canary Is.
Alopecosa kulsaryensis Ponomarev, 2012 – Kazakhstan
Alopecosa kungurica Esyunin, 1996 – Russia (Europe)
Alopecosa kuntzi Denis, 1953 – Italy (Sicily), Turkey, Russia (Caucasus), Yemen
Alopecosa laciniosa (Simon, 1876) – Spain, France
Alopecosa lallemandi (Berland, 1913) – Ecuador
Alopecosa latifasciata (Kroneberg, 1875) – Central Asia
Alopecosa leonhardii (Strand, 1913) – Australia (Central)
Alopecosa lessertiana Brignoli, 1983 – China
Alopecosa licenti (Schenkel, 1953) – Russia (South Siberia, Far East), Mongolia, China, Korea
Alopecosa lindbergi Roewer, 1960 – Afghanistan
Alopecosa linzhan Chen & Song, 2003 – China
Alopecosa litvinovi Izmailova, 1989 – Russia (South Siberia)
Alopecosa longicymbia Savelyeva, 1972 – Kazakhstan
Alopecosa madigani (Hickman, 1944) – Australia (Northern Territory)
Alopecosa mariae (Dahl, 1908) – Italy, Central Europe to Ukraine and south-eastern Europe, Russia (Europe to South Siberia), China
Alopecosa marikovskyi Logunov, 2013 – Kazakhstan
Alopecosa medvedevi Ponomarev, 2009 – Kazakhstan
Alopecosa michaelseni (Simon, 1902) – Chile
Alopecosa mikhailovi Omelko, Marusik & Koponen, 2013 – Russia (Sakhalin)
Alopecosa moesta (Holmberg, 1876) – Argentina
Alopecosa mojonia (Mello-Leitão, 1941) – Argentina
Alopecosa moriutii Tanaka, 1985 – Russia (Far East), Korea, Japan
Alopecosa mutabilis (Kulczyński, 1908) – Russia (Europe to East Siberia), USA (Alaska)
Alopecosa nagpag Chen, Song & Kim, 2001 – China
Alopecosa nemurensis (Strand, 1907) – Japan
Alopecosa nigricans (Simon, 1886) – Argentina, Falkland Is.
Alopecosa nitidus Hu, 2001 – China
Alopecosa notabilis (Schmidt, 1895) – Kazakhstan
Alopecosa nybelini Roewer, 1960 – Afghanistan
Alopecosa oahuensis (Keyserling, 1890) – Hawaii
Alopecosa obscura Schmidt, 1980 – Canary Is.
Alopecosa obsoleta (C. L. Koch, 1847) – Turkmenistan
Alopecosa ogorodica Trilikauskas & Azarkina, 2014 – Russia (Altai)
Alopecosa orbisaca Peng, Yin, Zhang & Kim, 1997 – China
Alopecosa orophila (Thorell, 1887) – Myanmar
Alopecosa orotavensis (Strand, 1916) – Canary Is.
Alopecosa osa Marusik, Hippa & Koponen, 1996 – Russia (South Siberia)
Alopecosa osellai Lugetti & Tongiorgi, 1969 – Spain
Alopecosa ovalis Chen, Song & Gao, 2000 – China
Alopecosa palmae Schmidt, 1982 – Canary Is.
Alopecosa passibilis (O. Pickard-Cambridge, 1885) – China
Alopecosa pelusiaca (Audouin, 1826) – North Africa
Alopecosa pentheri (Nosek, 1905) – Italy, south-eastern Europe, Ukraine, Turkey, Caucasus (Russia, Azerbaijan)
Alopecosa pictilis (Emerton, 1885) – North America, Russia (South and north-eastern Siberia, Far East)
Alopecosa pinetorum (Thorell, 1856) – Europe, Caucasus, Russia (Europe to South Siberia)
Alopecosa psammophila Buchar, 2001 – Czechia, Slovakia, Hungary, Romania
Alopecosa pseudocuneata (Schenkel, 1953) – China
Alopecosa pulverulenta (Clerck, 1757) – Europe, Turkey, Caucasus, Russia (Europe to Far East), Kazakhstan, Iran, China, Korea, Japan
Alopecosa pulverulenta tridentina (Thorell, 1875) – Austria
Alopecosa raddei (Simon, 1889) – Central Asia
Alopecosa rapa (Karsch, 1881) – Kiribati (Gilbert Is.)
Alopecosa restricta Mello-Leitão, 1940 – Argentina
Alopecosa rosea Mello-Leitão, 1945 – Argentina
Alopecosa saurica Marusik, 1995 – Kazakhstan
Alopecosa schmidti (Hahn, 1835) – Sweden, Central to eastern and south-eastern Europe, Turkey, Caucasus, Russia (Europe to South Siberia), Kazakhstan, Iran
Alopecosa sciophila Ponomarev, 2008 – Kazakhstan
Alopecosa sibirica (Kulczyński, 1908) – Russia (Middle Siberia to Far East), Mongolia, China
Alopecosa simoni (Thorell, 1872) – Mediterranean
Alopecosa sokhondoensis Logunov & Marusik, 1995 – Russia (Middle and South Siberia)
Alopecosa solitaria (Herman, 1879) – Italy, Central to south-eastern and eastern Europe, Turkey, Caucasus, Russia (Europe to South Siberia), Kazakhstan
Alopecosa solivaga (Kulczyński, 1901) – Russia (Europe, Siberia, Far East), Mongolia, China
Alopecosa solivaga annulata (Kulczyński, 1916) – Russia (West Siberia)
Alopecosa solivaga borea (Kulczyński, 1908) – Russia (Middle Siberia)
Alopecosa solivaga katunjica (Ermolajev, 1937) – Russia (Altai)
Alopecosa solivaga lineata (Kulczyński, 1916) – Russia (West Siberia)
Alopecosa spasskyi Ponomarev, 2008 – Russia (Europe), Kazakhstan
Alopecosa spinata Yu & Song, 1988 – China
Alopecosa steppica Ponomarev, 2007 – Ukraine, Russia (Europe), Kazakhstan
Alopecosa striatipes (C. L. Koch, 1839) – Europe, Turkey, Caucasus
Alopecosa sublimbata Roewer, 1960 – Equatorial Guinea (Bioko)
Alopecosa subrufa (Schenkel, 1963) – Russia (South Siberia), Mongolia, China
Alopecosa subsolitaria Savelyeva, 1972 – Kazakhstan
Alopecosa subvalida Guy, 1966 – Morocco
Alopecosa sulzeri (Pavesi, 1873) – Europe, Caucasus, Russia (Europe to South Siberia), Kazakhstan
Alopecosa taeniata (C. L. Koch, 1835) – Europe, Russia (Europe to South Siberia)
Alopecosa taeniopus (Kulczyński, 1895) – Greece to China
Alopecosa tanakai Omelko & Marusik, 2008 – Russia (Far East)
Alopecosa thaleri Hepner & Paulus, 2007 – Canary Is.
Alopecosa trabalis (Clerck, 1757) – Europe, Turkey, Russia (Europe to South Siberia), Kazakhstan, Iran, Central Asia
Alopecosa tunetana Roewer, 1960 – Tunisia
Alopecosa upembania Roewer, 1960 – Congo
Alopecosa valida (Lucas, 1846) – Morocco, Algeria
Alopecosa virgata (Kishida, 1910) – Russia (Far East), Korea, Japan
Alopecosa volubilis Yoo, Kim & Tanaka, 2004 – Russia (Far East), Korea, Japan
Alopecosa wenxianensis Tang, Yin & Yang, 1997 – China
Alopecosa werneri (Roewer, 1960) – Algeria
Alopecosa xiningensis Hu, 2001 – China
Alopecosa xinjiangensis Hu & Wu, 1989 – Mongolia, China
Alopecosa xuelin Tang & Zhang, 2004 – China
Alopecosa yamalensis Esyunin, 1996 – Russia (Europe, West Siberia)
Alopecosa zyuzini Logunov & Marusik, 1995 – Russia (South Siberia), Mongolia

Dubious names

Nomina dubia (dubious names) include:
Alopecosa reimoseri (Kolosváry, 1934)
Alopecosa strandi (Roșca, 1936)

Distribution and habitat
The genus has a cosmopolitan distribution. The majority of species are native to Eurasia, although some species occur in Africa, and others are found in North and South America. Alopecosa fabrilis is a critically endangered species found in Britain, with examples rediscovered in 2020 in the south of the country. They favor dry climates.

References

External links

 Picture of A. accentuata
 Chen, Jun; Song, Da-Xiang & Gao, Jiu-Chun (2000), "Two new species of the genus Alopecosa Simon (Araneae: Lycosidae) from Inner Mongolia, China", Zoological Studies 39(2): 133–137, PDF

 
Araneomorphae genera
Articles containing video clips
Cosmopolitan spiders